The 2016–17 American International Yellow Jackets men's ice hockey season was the 69th season of play for the program, the 21st at the Division I level, and the 14th in the Atlantic Hockey conference. The Yellow Jackets represented American International College and were coached by Eric Lang, in his 1st season.

Season
AIC began the season with a new coach for the first time in 32 years. Eric Lang, an alumnus, replaced Gary Wright behind the bench. The chance in leadership presaged a tone for the program and led to nice players leaving the team early. While all the roster spots were filled, the sizable roster turnover did no favors for the Yellow Jackets in terms of wins. In the first half of the season, American International won just 3 out of 18 games and were stuck in a familiar position; the bottom of the Atlantic Hockey standings.

While the team failed to win many games, they did fight hard and pushed several opponents into overtime. By the end of November the Yellow Jackets had more ties than losses and a great deal of credit could be attributed to the surprising defensive effort from the squad. The goaltending tandem of Alex Murray and Zackarias Skog combined to keep AIC in many games where they were otherwise outplayed and gave some hope that the team might be able to climb out of the conference cellar.

In the second half of the year the Yellow Jackets saw a moderate increase to their win total but the defense slipped. Murray struggled mightily as the season wore on and won just 1 of his 7 decisions. Since the revamped offense was little help, the bulk of the team's victories came on the shoulders of Skog, who posted a winning record after new year's. AIC finished 10th in the conference and, though their first round opponent was hardly formidable, the Yellow Jackets were unable to overcome Mercyhurst and were swept out of the postseason.

A disappointing finish was hardly a new state of affairs for the program, however, AIC had seen some signs of life during the season. Importantly, many of the new additions had played significant rolls in the team's limitded success. Not only had Skog established himself as the starting goaltender, but the top four scorers on the team were all freshmen.

Departures

Recruiting

Roster

|}

Standings

Schedule and results

|-
!colspan=12 style=";" | Regular Season

|-
!colspan=12 style=";" | 
|- align="center" bgcolor="#e0e0e0"

|- align="center" bgcolor="#e0e0e0"
|colspan=12|American International Lost Series 0–2

Scoring statistics

Goaltending statistics

Rankings

USCHO did not release a poll in Week 24.

References

2016-17
American International
American International
American International
American International